Events from the year 1696 in Ireland.

Incumbent
Monarch: William III

Events
April 27 – an act of the Parliament of England for encouraging linen manufacture in Ireland allows plain linen to be exported to England without an import tariff being applied.
Famine in the Scottish Borders leads to a new wave of Scottish Presbyterian migration from Scotland to Ulster.

Births
December 1 – Francis Burton, politician (d. 1744)
Sir Edward Barry, 1st Baronet, physician and politician (d. 1776)
Thomas Drennan, Presbyterian minister (d. 1768)
Approximate date – James Latham, portrait painter (d. 1747)
 Abraham Shackleton, Quaker (d. 1771)

Deaths

March 18 – Bonaventure Baron, Franciscan theologian (b. 1610)
May 9 – Henry Capell, Lord Deputy of Ireland (b. 1638)
October? – Sir Oliver St George, 1st Baronet, politician.
December 8 – Sir Charles Porter, Lord Chancellor of Ireland (b. 1631)
Daibhidh Ó Duibhgheannáin, scribe and poet (b. before 1651)

References

 
Years of the 17th century in Ireland
1690s in Ireland
Ireland